José Ramón Sauto Hurtado (12 September 1912 – 16 April 1994) was a Mexican/Spanish football player who played the position of midfielder for Real Madrid in the 1930s and 1940s.
He was the first Mexican born player to play for Real Madrid although he always played as Spaniard; his career spanned the Spanish Civil War.

Career
He made his debut for Real Madrid on 17 December 1933, in Real Madrid's 0–1 defeat versus Real Betis. He played for Real for six seasons, in 137 matches. He was a two time captain for the merengues.

Statistics at Real Madrid

References

External links
 
 
 1928-2008 Real Madrid players

1912 births
1994 deaths
Mexican footballers
Real Madrid CF players
Mexican expatriate sportspeople in Spain
Expatriate footballers in Spain
Association football midfielders
Footballers from Mexico City
Mexican expatriate footballers